Addison Alves de Oliveira (born March 20, 1981) is a retired Brazilian footballer who played as a striker and is the current assistant manager of Bali United.

Career statistics

Club

References

External links

Profile at liga-indonesia.co.id 

1981 births
Living people
Footballers from Brasília
Brazilian footballers
Association football forwards
Segunda División B players
Tercera División players
CD Huracán Z players
Cultural Leonesa footballers
Hércules CF players
FC Cartagena footballers
Burgos CF footballers
Coruxo FC players
Liga 1 (Indonesia) players
Persela Lamongan players
Addison Alves
Brazilian expatriate footballers
Brazilian expatriate sportspeople in Indonesia
Brazilian expatriate sportspeople in Spain
Expatriate footballers in Indonesia
Expatriate footballers in Thailand